Eduard Rivera Correa (born June 11, 1953) is a Puerto Rican politician and a former mayor of Río Grande. Rivera is affiliated with the Popular Democratic Party (PPD) and has served as mayor since 2005. Earned a bachelor's degree in business administration with a concentration in accounting from the University of Puerto Rico.

On July 10, 2014, Rivera Correa was arrested by the FBI on corruption charges. He officially resigned as Mayor on September 2, 2014. His deputy mayor, Rafael Ramos Matos, replaced him provisionally until a special election was held on September 14, 2014. In this election, Angel "Bori" González was elected as Rivera Correa's official replacement.

References

Living people
Mayors of places in Puerto Rico
Popular Democratic Party (Puerto Rico) politicians
Prisoners and detainees of the United States federal government
Puerto Rico politicians convicted of crimes
People from Río Grande, Puerto Rico
University of Puerto Rico alumni
1953 births